Nationalism is an idea and movement that holds that the nation should be congruent with the state. As a movement, it tends to promote the interests of a particular nation (as in a group of people), especially with the aim of gaining and maintaining the nation's sovereignty (self-governance) over its homeland to create a nation-state. It holds that each nation should govern itself, free from outside interference (self-determination), that a nation is a natural and ideal basis for a polity, and that the nation is the only rightful source of political power. It further aims to build and maintain a single national identity, based on a combination of shared social characteristics such as culture, ethnicity, geographic location, language, politics (or the government), religion, traditions and belief in a shared singular history, and to promote national unity or solidarity. Nationalism, therefore, seeks to preserve and foster a nation's traditional culture. There are various definitions of a "nation", which leads to different types of nationalism. The two main divergent forms are ethnic nationalism and civic nationalism. Historically, the civic type of nationalism was determinant factor in the development of modern constitutional and democratic value system since the beginnings, however the ethnic nationalism has a tendency to prefer authoritarian rule or even dictature.

Nationalism developed at the end of the 18th century, particularly with the French Revolution and the spread of the principle of popular sovereignty (the idea that "the people" should rule). Three main theories have been used to explain its emergence. Primordialism (perennialism) developed alongside nationalism during the romantic era and held that there have always been nations. This view has since been rejected by scholars, and nations are now viewed as socially constructed and historically contingent. Modernization theory, currently the most commonly accepted theory of nationalism, adopts a constructivist approach and proposes that nationalism emerged due to processes of modernization, such as industrialization, urbanization, and mass education, which made national consciousness possible. Proponents of this theory describe nations as "imagined communities" and nationalism as an "invented tradition" in which shared sentiment provides a form of collective identity and binds individuals together in political solidarity. A third theory, ethnosymbolism explains nationalism as a product of symbols, myths, and traditions, as is associated with the work of Anthony D. Smith. Additionally, the spread of nationalist movements during decolonization has led many theorists to examine the role of elites in mobilizing communities in order to maintain their power.

The moral value of nationalism, the relationship between nationalism and patriotism, and the compatibility of nationalism and cosmopolitanism are all subjects of philosophical debate. Nationalism can be combined with diverse political goals and ideologies such as conservatism (national conservatism and right-wing populism) or socialism (left-wing nationalism). In practice, nationalism is seen as positive or negative depending on its ideology and outcomes. Nationalism has been a feature of movements for freedom and justice, has been associated with cultural revivals, and encourages pride in national achievements. It has also been used to legitimize racial, ethnic, and religious divisions, suppress or attack minorities, and undermine human rights and democratic traditions. Radical nationalism combined with racial hatred was a key factor in the Holocaust perpetrated by Nazi Germany.

Terminology 

The terminological use of "nations", "sovereignty" and associated concepts were significantly refined with the writing by Hugo Grotius of De jure belli ac pacis in the early 17th century. Living in the times of the Eighty Years' War between Spain and the Netherlands and the Thirty Years' War between Catholic and Protestant European nations (Catholic France being in the otherwise Protestant camp), it is not surprising that Grotius was deeply concerned with matters of conflicts between nations in the context of oppositions stemming from religious differences. The word nation was also usefully applied before 1800 in Europe to refer to the inhabitants of a country as well as to collective identities that could include shared history, law, language, political rights, religion and traditions, in a sense more akin to the modern conception.

Nationalism as derived from the noun designating 'nations' is a newer word; in the English language, the term dates back from 1798. The term first became important in the 19th century. The term increasingly became negative in its connotations after 1914. Glenda Sluga notes that "The twentieth century, a time of profound disillusionment with nationalism, was also the great age of globalism."

Academics define nationalism as a political principle that holds that the nation and state should be congruent. According to Lisa Weeden, nationalist ideology presumes that "the people" and the state are congruent.

History 

Scholars frequently place the beginning of nationalism in the late 18th century or early 19th century with the American Declaration of Independence or with the French Revolution. The consensus is that nationalism as a concept was firmly established by the 19th century. In histories of nationalism, the French Revolution (1789) is seen as an important starting point, not only for its impact on French nationalism but even more for its impact on Germans and Italians and on European intellectuals. The template of nationalism, as a method for mobilizing public opinion around a new state based on popular sovereignty, went back further than 1789: philosophers such as Rousseau and Voltaire, whose ideas influenced the French Revolution, had themselves been influenced or encouraged by the example of earlier constitutionalist liberation movements, notably the Corsican Republic (1755–1768) and American Revolution (1775–1783).

Due to the Industrial Revolution, there was an emergence of an integrated, nation-encompassing economy and a national public sphere, where British people began to mobilize on a state-wide scale, rather than just in the smaller units of their province, town or family.  The early emergence of a popular patriotic nationalism took place in the mid-18th century and was actively promoted by the British government and by the writers and intellectuals of the time. National symbols, anthems, myths, flags and narratives were assiduously constructed by nationalists and widely adopted. The Union Jack was adopted in 1801 as the national one. Thomas Arne composed the patriotic song "Rule, Britannia!" in 1740, and the cartoonist John Arbuthnot invented the character of John Bull as the personification of the English national spirit in 1712.

The political convulsions of the late 18th century associated with the American and French revolutions massively augmented the widespread appeal of patriotic nationalism. Napoleon Bonaparte's rise to power further established nationalism when he invaded much of Europe. Napoleon used this opportunity to spread revolutionary ideas, resulting in much of the 19th-century European Nationalism.

The Prussian scholar Johann Gottfried Herder (1744–1803) originated the term in 1772 in his "Treatise on the Origin of Language" stressing the role of a common language. He attached exceptional importance to the concepts of nationality and of patriotism  "he that has lost his patriotic spirit has lost himself and the whole world about himself", whilst teaching that "in a certain sense every human perfection is national".

Some scholars argue that variants of nationalism emerged prior to the 18th century. American philosopher and historian Hans Kohn wrote in 1944 that nationalism emerged in the 17th century. In Britons, Forging the Nation 1707–1837 (Yale University Press, 1992), Linda Colley explores how the role of nationalism emerged about 1700 and developed in Britain reaching full form in the 1830s. Writing shortly after World War I, the popular British author H.G. Wells traced the origin of European nationalism to the aftermath of  the Reformation, when it filled the moral void left by the decline of Christian faith:[A]s the idea of Christianity as a world brotherhood of men sank into discredit because of its fatal entanglement with priestcraft and the Papacy on the one hand and with the authority of princes on the other, and the age of faith passed into our present age of doubt and disbelief, men shifted the reference of their lives from the kingdom of God and the brotherhood of mankind to these apparently more living realities, France and England, Holy Russia, Spain, Prussia.... **** In the thirteenth and fourteenth centuries the general population of Europe was religious and only vaguely patriotic; by the nineteenth it had become wholly patriotic.

19th century 

The political development of nationalism and the push for popular sovereignty culminated with the ethnic/national revolutions of Europe. During the 19th century nationalism became one of the most significant political and social forces in history; it is typically listed among the top causes of World War I.

Napoleon's conquests of the German and Italian states around 1800–1806 played a major role in stimulating nationalism and the demands for national unity.

English historian J. P. T. Bury argues:
Between 1830 and 1870 nationalism had thus made great strides. It inspired great literature, quickened scholarship, and nurtured heroes. It had shown its power both to unify and to divide. It had led to great achievements of political construction and consolidation in Germany and Italy; but it was more clear than ever a threat to the Ottoman and Habsburg empires, which were essentially multi-national. European culture had been enriched by the new vernacular contributions of little-known or forgotten peoples, but at the same time such unity as it had was imperiled by fragmentation. Moreover, the antagonisms fostered by nationalism had made not only for wars, insurrections, and local hatreds—they had accentuated or created new spiritual divisions in a nominally Christian Europe.

France 

Nationalism in France gained early expressions in France's revolutionary government. In 1793, that government declared a mass conscription (levée en masse) with a call to service:
Henceforth, until the enemies have been driven from the territory of the Republic, all the French are in permanent requisition for army service. The young men shall go to battle; the married men shall forge arms in the hospitals; the children shall turn old linen to lint; the old men shall repair to the public places, to stimulate the courage of the warriors and preach the unity of the Republic and the hatred of kings.

This nationalism gained pace after the French Revolution came to a close. Defeat in war, with a loss in territory, was a powerful force in nationalism. In France, revenge and return of Alsace-Lorraine was a powerful motivating force for a quarter century after their defeat by Germany in 1871. After 1895, French nationalists focused on Dreyfus and internal subversion, and the Alsace issue petered out.

The French reaction was a famous case of Revanchism ("revenge") which demands the return of lost territory that "belongs" to the national homeland. Revanchism draws its strength from patriotic and retributionist thought and it is often motivated by economic or geo-political factors. Extreme revanchist ideologues often represent a hawkish stance, suggesting that their desired objectives can be achieved through the positive outcome of another war. It is linked with irredentism, the conception that a part of the cultural and ethnic nation remains "unredeemed" outside the borders of its appropriate nation state. Revanchist politics often rely on the identification of a nation with a nation state, often mobilizing deep-rooted sentiments of ethnic nationalism, claiming territories outside the state where members of the ethnic group live, while using heavy-handed nationalism to mobilize support for these aims. Revanchist justifications are often presented as based on ancient or even autochthonous occupation of a territory since "time immemorial", an assertion that is usually inextricably involved in revanchism and irredentism, justifying them in the eyes of their proponents.

The Dreyfus Affair in France 1894–1906 made the battle against treason and disloyalty a central theme for conservative Catholic French nationalists. Dreyfus, a Jew, was an outsider, that is in the views of intense nationalists, not a true Frenchman, not one to be trusted, not one to be given the benefit of the doubt. True loyalty to the nation, from the conservative viewpoint, was threatened by liberal and republican principles of liberty and equality that were leading the country to disaster.

Russia 

Before 1815, the sense of Russian nationalism was weak—what sense there was focused on loyalty and obedience to the tsar. The Russian motto "Orthodoxy, Autocracy, and Nationality" was coined by Count Sergey Uvarov and it was adopted by Emperor Nicholas I as the official ideology of the Russian Empire. Three components of Uvarov's triad were:
 OrthodoxyOrthodox Christianity and protection of the Russian Orthodox Church.
 Autocracyunconditional loyalty to the House of Romanov in return for paternalist protection for all social estates.
 Nationality (Narodnost, has been also translated as national spirit)recognition of the state-founding role on Russian nationality.

By the 1860s, as a result of educational indoctrination, and due to conservative resistance to ideas and ideologies which were transmitted from Western Europe, a pan-Slavic movement had emerged and it produced both a sense of Russian nationalism and a nationalistic mission to support and protect pan-Slavism. This Slavophile movement became popular in 19th-century Russia. Pan-Slavism was fueled by, and it was also the fuel for Russia's numerous wars against the Ottoman Empire which were waged in order to achieve the alleged goal of liberating Orthodox nationalities, such as Bulgarians, Romanians, Serbs and Greeks, from Ottoman rule. Slavophiles opposed the Western European influences which had been transmitted to Russia and they were also determined to protect Russian culture and traditions. Aleksey Khomyakov, Ivan Kireyevsky, and Konstantin Aksakov are credited with co-founding the movement.

Latin America 

An upsurge in nationalism in Latin America in the 1810s and 1820s sparked revolutions that cost Spain nearly all of its colonies which were located there. Spain was at war with Britain from 1798 to 1808, and the British Royal Navy cut off its contacts with its colonies, so nationalism flourished and trade with Spain was suspended. The colonies set up temporary governments or juntas which were effectively independent from Spain. These juntas were established as a result of Napoleon's resistance failure in Spain. They served to determine new leadership and, in colonies like Caracas, abolished the slave trade as well as the Indian tribute. The division exploded between Spaniards who were born in Spain (called "peninsulares") versus those of Spanish descent born in New Spain (called "criollos" in Spanish or "creoles" in English). The two groups wrestled for power, with the criollos leading the call for independence. Spain tried to use its armies to fight back but had no help from European powers. Indeed, Britain and the United States worked against Spain, enforcing the Monroe Doctrine. Spain lost all of its American colonies, except Cuba and Puerto Rico, in a complex series of revolts from 1808 to 1826.

Germany 

In the German states west of Prussia, Napoleon abolished many of the old or medieval relics, such as dissolving the Holy Roman Empire in 1806. He imposed rational legal systems and demonstrated how dramatic changes were possible. His organization of the Confederation of the Rhine in 1806 promoted a feeling of nationalism.

Nationalists sought to encompass masculinity in their quest for strength and unity. It was Prussian chancellor Otto von Bismarck who achieved German unification through a series of highly successful short wars against Denmark, Austria and France which thrilled the pan-German nationalists in the smaller German states. They fought in his wars and eagerly joined the new German Empire, which Bismarck ran as a force for balance and peace in Europe after 1871.

In the 19th century, German nationalism was promoted by Hegelian-oriented academic historians who saw Prussia as the true carrier of the German spirit, and the power of the state as the ultimate goal of nationalism. The three main historians were Johann Gustav Droysen (1808–1884), Heinrich von Sybel (1817–1895) and Heinrich von Treitschke (1834–1896). Droysen moved from liberalism to an intense nationalism that celebrated Prussian Protestantism, efficiency, progress, and reform, in striking contrast to Austrian Catholicism, impotency and backwardness. He idealized the Hohenzollern kings of Prussia. His large-scale History of Prussian Politics (14 vol 1855–1886) was foundational for nationalistic students and scholars. Von Sybel founded and edited the leading academic history journal, Historische Zeitschrift and as the director of the Prussian state archives published massive compilations that were devoured by scholars of nationalism.

The most influential of the German nationalist historians, was Treitschke who had an enormous influence on elite students at Heidelberg and Berlin universities. Treitschke vehemently attacked parliamentarianism, socialism, pacifism, the English, the French, the Jews, and the internationalists. The core of his message was the need for a strong, unified state—a unified Germany under Prussian supervision. "It is the highest duty of the State to increase its power," he stated. Although he was a descendant of a Czech family, he considered himself not Slavic but German: "I am 1000 times more the patriot than a professor."

German nationalism, expressed through the ideology of National Socialism, may also be understood as trans-national in nature. This aspect was primarily advocated by Adolf Hitler, who later became the leader of the National Socialist Party. This party was devoted to what they identified as an Aryan race, residing in various European countries, but sometime mixed with alien elements such as Jews.

Meanwhile, the Nazis rejected many of the well-established citizens within those same countries, such as the Romani (Gypsies) and of course Jews, whom they did not identify as Aryan. A key Nazi doctrine was "Living Space" (for Aryans only) or "Lebensraum," which was a vast undertaking to transplant Aryans throughout Poland, much of Eastern Europe and the Baltic nations, and all of Western Russia and Ukraine. Lebensraum was thus a vast project for advancing the Aryan race far outside of any particular nation or national borders. The Nazi's goals were racist focused on advancing the Aryan race as they perceived it, eugenics modification of the human race, and the eradication of human beings that they deemed inferior. But their goals were trans-national and intended to spread across as much of the world as they could achieve. Although Nazism glorified German history, it also embraced the supposed virtues and achievements of the Aryan race in other countries, including India. The Nazis' Aryanism longed for now-extinct species of superior bulls once used as livestock by Aryans and other features of Aryan history that never resided within the borders of Germany as a nation.

Italy 

Italian nationalism emerged in the 19th century and was the driving force for Italian unification or the Risorgimento (meaning the "Resurgence" or "Revival"). It was the political and intellectual movement that consolidated the different states of the Italian peninsula into the single state of the Kingdom of Italy in 1861. The memory of the Risorgimento is central to Italian nationalism but it was based in the liberal middle classes and ultimately proved a bit weak. The new government treated the newly annexed South as a kind of underdeveloped province for its "backward" and poverty-stricken society, its poor grasp of standard Italian (as Italo-Dalmatian dialects of Neapolitan and Sicilian were prevalent in the common use) and its traditions. The liberals had always been strong opponents of the pope and the very well organized Catholic Church. The liberal government under the Sicilian Francesco Crispi sought to enlarge his political base by emulating Otto von Bismarck and firing up Italian nationalism with an aggressive foreign policy. It partially crashed and his cause was set back. Of his nationalistic foreign policy, historian R. J. B. Bosworth says:
[Crispi] pursued policies whose openly aggressive character would not be equaled until the days of the Fascist regime. Crispi increased military expenditure, talked cheerfully of a European conflagration, and alarmed his German or British friends with these suggestions of preventative attacks on his enemies.  His policies were ruinous, both for Italy's trade with France, and, more humiliatingly, for colonial ambitions in East Africa. Crispi's lust for territory there was thwarted when on 1 March 1896, the armies of Ethiopian Emperor Menelik routed Italian forces at Adowa [...] in what has been defined as an unparalleled disaster for a modern army. Crispi, whose private life and personal finances [...] were objects of perennial scandal, went into dishonorable retirement.

Italy joined the Allies in the First World War after getting promises of territory, but its war effort was not honored after the war and this fact discredited liberalism paving the way for Benito Mussolini and a political doctrine of his own creation, Fascism. Mussolini's 20-year dictatorship involved a highly aggressive nationalism that led to a series of wars with the creation of the Italian Empire, an alliance with Hitler's Germany, and humiliation and hardship in the Second World War. After 1945, the Catholics returned to government and tensions eased somewhat, but the former two Sicilies remained poor and partially underdeveloped (by industrial country standards). In the 1950s and early 1960s, Italy had an economic boom that pushed its economy to the fifth place in the world.

The working class in those decades voted mostly for the Communist Party, and it looked to Moscow rather than Rome for inspiration and was kept out of the national government even as it controlled some industrial cities across the North. In the 21st century, the Communists have become marginal but political tensions remained high as shown by Umberto Bossi's Padanism in the 1980s (whose party Lega Nord has come to partially embrace a moderate version of Italian nationalism over the years) and other separatist movements spread across the country.

Greece 
During the early 19th century, inspired by romanticism, classicism, former movements of Greek nationalism and failed Greek revolts against the Ottoman Empire (such as the Orlofika revolt in southern Greece in 1770, and the Epirus-Macedonian revolt of Northern Greece in 1575), Greek nationalism led to the Greek war of independence. The Greek drive for independence from the Ottoman Empire in the 1820s and 1830s inspired supporters across Christian Europe, especially in Britain, which was the result of western idealization of Classical Greece and romanticism. France, Russia and Britain critically intervened to ensure the success of this nationalist endeavor.

Serbia 

For centuries the Orthodox Christian Serbs were ruled by the Muslim Ottoman Empire. The success of the Serbian Revolution against Ottoman rule in 1817 marked the birth of the Principality of Serbia. It achieved de facto independence in 1867 and finally gained international recognition in 1878. Serbia had sought to liberate and unite with Bosnia and Herzegovina to the west and Old Serbia (Kosovo and Vardar Macedonia) to the south. Nationalist circles in both Serbia and Croatia (part of Austria-Hungary) began to advocate for a greater South Slavic union in the 1860s, claiming Bosnia as their common land based on shared language and tradition. In 1914, Serb revolutionaries in Bosnia assassinated Archduke Ferdinand. Austria-Hungary, with German backing, tried to crush Serbia in 1914, thus igniting the First World War in which Austria-Hungary dissolved into nation states.

In 1918, the region of Banat, Bačka and Baranja came under control of the Serbian army, later the Great National Assembly of Serbs, Bunjevci and other Slavs voted to join Serbia; the Kingdom of Serbia joined the union with State of Slovenes, Croats and Serbs on 1 December 1918, and the country was named Kingdom of Serbs, Croats, and Slovenes. It was renamed Yugoslavia, and a Yugoslav identity was promoted, which ultimately failed. After the Second World War, Yugoslav Communists established a new socialist republic of Yugoslavia. That state broke up again  in the 1990s.

Poland 

The cause of Polish nationalism was repeatedly frustrated before 1918. In the 1790s, the Habsburg monarchy, Prussia and Russia
invaded, annexed, and subsequently partitioned Poland. Napoleon set up the Duchy of Warsaw, a new Polish state that ignited a spirit of nationalism. Russia took it over in 1815 as Congress Poland with the tsar proclaimed as "King of Poland". Large-scale nationalist revolts erupted in 1830 and 1863–64 but were harshly crushed by Russia, which tried to make the Polish language, culture and religion more like Russia's. The collapse of the Russian Empire in the First World War enabled the major powers to re-establish an independent Poland, which survived until 1939. Meanwhile, Poles in areas controlled by Germany moved into heavy industry but their religion came under attack by Bismarck in the Kulturkampf of the 1870s. The Poles joined German Catholics in a well-organized new Centre Party, and defeated Bismarck politically. He responded by stopping the harassment and cooperating with the Centre Party.

In the late 19th and early 20th century, many Polish nationalist leaders endorsed the Piast Concept. It held there was a Polish utopia during the Piast Dynasty a thousand years before, and modern Polish nationalists should restore its central values of Poland for the Poles. Jan Poplawski had developed the "Piast Concept" in the 1890s, and it formed the centerpiece of Polish nationalist ideology, especially as presented by the National Democracy Party, known as the "Endecja," which was led by Roman Dmowski. In contrast with the Jagiellon concept, there was no concept for a multi-ethnic Poland.

The Piast concept stood in opposition to the "Jagiellon Concept," which allowed for multi-ethnicism and Polish rule over numerous minority groups such as those in the Kresy. The Jagiellon Concept was the official policy of the government in the 1920s and 1930s. Soviet dictator Josef Stalin at Tehran in 1943 rejected the Jagiellon Concept because it involved Polish rule over Ukrainians and Belarusians. He instead endorsed the Piast Concept, which justified a massive shift of Poland's frontiers to the west. After 1945 the Soviet-back puppet communist regime wholeheartedly adopted the Piast Concept, making it the centerpiece of their claim to be the "true inheritors of Polish nationalism". After all the killings, including Nazi German occupation, terror in Poland and population transfers during and after the war, the nation was officially declared as 99% ethnically Polish.

In current Polish politics, Polish nationalism is most openly represented by parties linked in the Liberty and Independence Confederation coalition. As of 2020 the Confederation, composed of several smaller parties, had 11 deputies (under 7%) in the Sejm.

Bulgaria

Bulgarian modern nationalism emerged under Ottoman rule in the late 18th and early 19th century, under the influence of western ideas such as liberalism and nationalism, which trickled into the country after the French Revolution.

The Bulgarian national revival started with the work of Saint Paisius of Hilendar, who opposed Greek domination of Bulgaria's culture and religion. His work Istoriya Slavyanobolgarskaya ("History of the Slav-Bulgarians"), which appeared in 1762, was the first work of Bulgarian historiography. It is considered Paisius' greatest work and one of the greatest pieces of Bulgarian literature. In it, Paisius interpreted Bulgarian medieval history with the goal of reviving the spirit of his nation.

His successor was Saint Sophronius of Vratsa, who started the struggle for an independent Bulgarian church. An autonomous Bulgarian Exarchate was established in 1870/1872 for the Bulgarian diocese wherein at least two-thirds of Orthodox Christians were willing to join it.

In 1869 the Internal Revolutionary Organization was initiated.

The April Uprising of 1876 indirectly resulted in the re-establishment of Bulgaria in 1878.

Judaism 
Jewish nationalism arose in the latter half of the 19th century and its rise was largely correlated with the rise of the Zionist movement. The term "Zionism" was derived from the word Zion, which was one of the Torah's names of the city of Jerusalem. The end goal of Jewish nationalists and Zionists was the founding of a Jewish state, preferably in the land of Israel. A tumultuous history of living in oppressive, foreign, and uncertain circumstances led the supporters of the movement to draft a declaration of independence, claiming that Israel was a homeland. The first and second destructions of the temple and ancient Torah prophecies largely shaped the incentives of the Jewish nationalists. Many prominent theories in Jewish theology and eschatology were formed by supporters and opponents of the movement in this era.

It was the French Revolution of 1789 which sparked new waves of thinking across Europe regarding governance and sovereignty. A shift from the traditional hierarchy-based system towards political individualism and citizen-states posed a dilemma for the Jews. Citizenship was now essential when it came to ensuring basic legal and residential rights. This resulted in more and more Jews choosing to identify with certain nationalities in order to maintain these rights. Logic said that a nation-based system of states would require the Jews themselves to claim their own right to be considered a nation due to a distinguishable language and history. According to historian David Engel, Zionism was more about fear that Jews would end up dispersed and unprotected, rather than fulfilling old prophecies of historical texts.

20th century

China 

The awakening of nationalism across Asia helped shape the history of the continent. The key episode was the decisive defeat of Russia by Japan in 1905, demonstrating the military advancement of non-Europeans in a modern war. The defeat which quickly led to manifestations of a new interest in nationalism in China, as well as Turkey, and Persia. In China Sun Yat-sen (1866–1925) launched his new party the Kuomintang (National People's Party) in defiance of the decrepit Empire, which was run by outsiders. The Kuomintang recruits pledged:
[F]rom this moment I will destroy the old and build the new, and fight for the self-determination of the people, and will apply all my strength to the support of the Chinese Republic and the realization of democracy through the Three Principles, ... for the progress of good government, the happiness and perpetual peace of the people, and for the strengthening of the foundations of the state in the name of peace throughout the world.

The Kuomintang largely ran China until the Communists took over in 1949. But the latter had also been strongly influenced by Sun's nationalism as well as by the May Fourth Movement in 1919. It was a nationwide protest movement about the domestic backwardness of China and has often been depicted as the intellectual foundation for Chinese Communism. The New Culture Movement stimulated by the May Fourth Movement waxed strong throughout the 1920s and 1930s. Historian Patricia Ebrey says:
Nationalism, patriotism, progress, science, democracy, and freedom were the goals; imperialism, feudalism, warlordism, autocracy, patriarchy, and blind adherence to tradition were the enemies. Intellectuals struggled with how to be strong and modern and yet Chinese, how to preserve China as a political entity in the world of competing nations.

Greece 

Nationalist irredentist movements Greek advocating for Enosis (unity of ethnically Greek states with the Hellenic Republic to create a unified Greek state), used today in the case of Cyprus, as well as the Megali Idea, the Greek movement that advocated for the reconquering of Greek ancestral lands from the Ottoman Empire (such as Crete, Ionia, Pontus, Northern Epirus, Cappadocia, Thrace among others) that were popular in the late 19th and early to 20th centuries, led to many Greek states and regions that were ethnically Greek to eventually unite with Greece and the Greco-Turkish war of 1919.

The 4th of August regime was a fascist or fascistic nationalist authoritarian dictatorship inspired by Mussolini's Fascist Italy and Hitler's Germany and led by Greek general Ioannis Metaxas from 1936 to his death in 1941. It advocated for the Third Hellenic Civilization, a culturally superior Greek civilization that would be the successor of the First and Second Greek civilizations, that were Ancient Greece and the Byzantine empire respectively. It promoted Greek traditions, folk music and dances, classicism as well as medievalism.

Africa 

In the 1880s the European powers divided up almost all of Africa (only Ethiopia and Liberia were independent). They ruled until after World War II when forces of nationalism grew much stronger. In the 1950s and the 1960s, colonial holdings became independent states. The process was usually peaceful but there were several long bitter bloody civil wars, as in Algeria, Kenya and elsewhere.

Across Africa, nationalism drew upon the organizational skills that natives had learned in the British and French, and other armies during the world wars. It led to organizations that were not controlled by or endorsed by either the colonial powers or the traditional local power structures that had been collaborating with the colonial powers. Nationalistic organizations began to challenge both the traditional and the new colonial structures and finally displaced them. Leaders of nationalist movements took control when the European authorities exited; many ruled for decades or until they died off. These structures included political, educational, religious, and other social organizations. In recent decades, many African countries have undergone the triumph and defeat of nationalistic fervor, changing in the process the loci of the centralizing state power and patrimonial state.

South Africa, a British colony, was exceptional in that it became virtually independent by 1931. From 1948, it was controlled by white Afrikaner nationalists, who focused on racial segregation and white minority rule, known as apartheid. It lasted until 1994, when multiracial elections were held. The international anti-apartheid movement supported black nationalists until success was achieved, and Nelson Mandela was elected president.

Middle East 
Arab nationalism, a movement toward liberating and empowering the Arab peoples of the Middle East, emerged during the late 19th century, inspired by other independence movements of the 18th and 19th centuries. As the Ottoman Empire declined and the Middle East was carved up by the Great Powers of Europe, Arabs sought to establish their own independent nations ruled by Arabs, rather than foreigners. Syria was established in 1920; Transjordan (later Jordan) gradually gained independence between 1921 and 1946; Saudi Arabia was established in 1932; and Egypt achieved gradually gained independence between 1922 and 1952. The Arab League was established in 1945 to promote Arab interests and cooperation between the new Arab states.

The Zionist movement, emerged among European Jews in the 19th century. In 1882, Jews,from Europe, began to emigrate to Ottoman Palestine with the goal of establishing a new Jewish homeland.The majority and local population in Palestine,Palestinian Arabs were demanding independence from the British Mandate.

Breakup of Yugoslavia 

There was a rise in extreme nationalism after the Revolutions of 1989 had triggered the collapse of communism in the 1990s. That left many people with no identity. The people under communist rule had to integrate, but they now found themselves free to choose. That made long-dormant conflicts rise and create sources of serious conflict. When communism fell in Yugoslavia, serious conflict arose, which led to a rise in extreme nationalism.

In his 1992 article Jihad vs. McWorld, Benjamin Barber proposed that the fall of communism would cause large numbers of people to search for unity and that small-scale wars would become common, as groups will attempt to redraw boundaries, identities, cultures and ideologies. The fall of communism also allowed for an "us vs. them" mentality to return. Governments would become vehicles for social interests, and the country would attempt to form national policies based on the majority culture, religion or ethnicity. Some newly sprouted democracies had large differences in policies on matters, which ranged from immigration and human rights to trade and commerce.

The academic Steven Berg felt that the root of nationalist conflicts was the demand for autonomy and a separate existence. That nationalism can give rise to strong emotions, which may lead to a group fighting to survive, especially as after the fall of communism, political boundaries did not match ethnic boundaries. Serious conflicts often arose and escalated very easily, as individuals and groups acted upon their beliefs and caused death and destruction. When that happens, states unable to contain the conflict run the risk of slowing their progress at democratization.

Yugoslavia was established after the First World War and was a merger of three separate ethnic groups: Serbs, Croats and Slovenes. The national census numbers from 1971 to 1981 measured an increase from 1.3% to 5.4% in the population that ethnically identified itself as Yugoslavs. That meant that the country, almost as a whole, was divided by distinctive religious, ethnic and national loyalties after nearly 50 years.

In Yugoslavia, separating Croatia and Slovenia from the rest of Yugoslavia is an invisible line of previous conquests of the region. Croatia and Slovenia, in the northwest, were conquered by Catholics or Protestants and benefited from European history: the Renaissance, the French Revolution and the Industrial Revolution. That made them more inclined towards democracy. The remaining Yugoslavian territory was conquered by the Ottoman or Russian Empires, are Orthodox or Muslims, are less economically advanced and are less inclined toward democracy.

In the 1970s, the leadership of the separate territories in Yugoslavia protected only territorial interests, at the expense of other territories. In Croatia, there was almost a split within the territory between Serbs and Croats so that any political decision would kindle unrest, and tensions could cross adjacent territories: Bosnia and Herzegovina. Bosnia had no group with a majority; Muslim, Serb, Croat, and Yugoslavs stopped leadership from advancing here either. Political organizations were not able to deal successfully with such diverse nationalisms. Within the territories, leaderships would not compromise. To do so would create a winner in one ethnic group and a loser in another and raise the possibility of a serious conflict. That strengthened the political stance promoting ethnic identities and caused intense and divided political leadership within Yugoslavia.

In the 1980s, Yugoslavia began to break into fragments. Economic conditions within Yugoslavia were deteriorating. Conflict in the disputed territories was stimulated by the rise in mass nationalism and ethnic hostilities. The per capita income of people in the northwestern territory, encompassing Croatia and Slovenia, was several times higher than that of the southern territory. That, combined with escalating violence from ethnic Albanians and Serbs in Kosovo, intensified economic conditions. The violence greatly contributed to the rise of extreme nationalism of Serbs in Serbia and the rest of Yugoslavia. The ongoing conflict in Kosovo was propagandized by a communist Serb, Slobodan Milošević, to increase Serb nationalism further. As mentioned, that nationalism gave rise to powerful emotions which grew the force of Serbian nationalism by highly-nationalist demonstrations in Vojvodina, Serbia, Montenegro, and Kosovo. Serbian nationalism was so high that Slobodan Milošević ousted leaders in Vojvodina and Montenegro, repressed Albanians within Kosovo and eventually controlled four of the eight regions/territories. Slovenia, one of the four regions not under communist control, favoured a democratic state.

In Slovenia, fear was mounting because Milošević would use the militia to suppress the country, as had occurred in Kosovo. Half of Yugoslavia wanted to be democratic, the other wanted a new nationalist authoritarian regime. In fall of 1989, tensions came to a head, and Slovenia asserted its political and economic independence from Yugoslavia and seceded. In January 1990, there was a total break with Serbia at the League of Communists of Yugoslavia, an institution that had been conceived by Milošević to strengthen unity and later became the backdrop for the fall of communism in Yugoslavia.

In August 1990, a warning to the region was issued when ethnically divided groups attempted to alter the government structure. The republic borders established by the Communist regime in the postwar period were extremely vulnerable to challenges from ethnic communities. Ethnic communities arose because they did not share the identity with everyone within the new post-communist borders, which threatened the new governments. The same disputes were erupting that were in place prior to Milošević and were compounded by actions from his regime.

Also, within the territory, the Croats and the Serbs were in direct competition for control of government. Elections were held and increased potential conflicts between Serbian and Croat nationalism. Serbia wanted to be separate and to decide its own future based on its own ethnic composition, but that would then give Kosovo encouragement to become independent from Serbia. Albanians in Kosovo were already practically independent from Kosovo, but Serbia did not want to let Kosovo become independent. Albanian nationalists wanted their own territory, but that would require a redrawing of the map and threaten neighboring territories. When communism fell in Yugoslavia, serious conflict arose, which led to the rise in extreme nationalism.

Nationalism again gave rise to powerful emotions, which evoked, in some extreme cases, a willingness to die for what one believed, a fight for the survival of the group. The end of communism began a long period of conflict and war for the region. For six years, 200,000–500,000 people died in the Bosnian War. All three major ethnicities in Bosnia and Herzegovina (Bosnian Muslims, Croats, Serbs) suffered at the hands of each other. The war garnered assistance from groups, Muslim, Orthodox, and Western Christian, and from state actors, which supplied all sides; Saudi Arabia and Iran supported Bosnia; Russia supported Serbia; Central European and the West, including the US, supported Croatia; and the Pope supported Slovenia and Croatia.

21st century 

Arab nationalism began to decline in the 21st century, which led to localized nationalism and culminated in a series of revolts against authoritarian regimes between 2010 and 2012, known as the Arab Spring. Following those revolts, most of which failing to improve conditions in the affected nations, Arab and even most local nationalist movements declined dramatically. A consequence of the Arab Spring as well as the 2003 invasion of Iraq were the civil wars in Iraq and Syria, which eventually joined to form a single conflict. A new form of Arab nationalism developed in the wake of the Arab Winter, associated with Egyptian President Abdel Fatteh el-Sisi, Saudi Crown Prince Mohammad bin Salman and UAE leader Mohammed bin Zayed.

The rise of globalism in the late 20th century led to a rise in nationalism and populism in Europe and North America. That trend was further fueled by increased terrorism in the West (the September 11 attacks in the United States being a prime example), increasing unrest and civil wars in the Middle East, and waves of Muslim refugees, especially from the Syrian Civil War, flooding into Europe ( the refugee crisis appears to have peaked). Nationalist groups like Germany's Pegida, France's National Front and the UK Independence Party gained prominence in their respective nations advocating restrictions on immigration to protect the local populations.

Since 2010, Catalan nationalists have led a renewed Catalan independence movement and declared Catalan independence. The movement has been opposed by Spanish nationalists. In the 2010s, the Greek economic crisis and waves of immigration have led to a significant rise of Fascism and Greek nationalism across Greece, especially among the youth.

In Russia, exploitation of nationalist sentiments allowed Vladimir Putin to consolidate power. This nationalist sentiment was used in Russia's annexation of Crimea in 2014 and other actions in Ukraine. Nationalist movements gradually began to rise in Central Europe as well, particularly Poland, under the influence of the ruling party, Law and Justice (led by Jaroslaw Kaczynski). In Hungary, the anti-immigration rhetoric and stance against foreign influence is a powerful national glue promoted the ruling Fidesz party (led by Viktor Orbán). Nationalist parties have also joined governing coalitions in Bulgaria, Slovakia, Latvia and Ukraine.

In India, Hindu nationalism has grown in popularity with the rise of the Bharatiya Janata Party, a right-wing party which has been ruling India at the national level since 2014. The rise in religious nationalism comes with the rise of right-wing populism in India, with the election and re-election of populist leader Narendra Modi as Prime Minister, who promised economic prosperity for all and an end to corruption. Militant Buddhist nationalism is also on the rise in Myanmar, Thailand and Sri Lanka.

In Japan, nationalist influences  in the government developed over the course of the early 21th century, largely from the far right ultra-conservative Nippon Kaigi organization. The new movement has advocated re-establishing Japan as a military power and pushed revisionist historical narratives denying events such as the Nanking Massacre.

A referendum on Scottish independence from the United Kingdom was held on 18 September 2014. The proposal was defeated, with 55.3% voting against independence. In a 2016 referendum, the British populace voted to withdraw the United Kingdom from the European Union (known as Brexit). The result had been largely unexpected and was seen as a victory of populism. As the promise of continued European Union membership was a core feature of the anti-independence campaign during the Scottish referendum, there have been calls for a second referendum on Scottish independence.

The 2016 United States presidential campaign saw the unprecedented rise of Donald Trump, a businessman with no political experience who ran on a populist/nationalist platform and struggled to gain endorsements from mainstream political figures, even within his own party. Trump's slogans "Make America Great Again" and "America First" exemplified his campaign's repudiation of globalism and its staunchly nationalistic outlook. His unexpected victory in the election was seen as part of the same trend that had brought about the Brexit vote. On 22 October 2018, two weeks before the mid-term elections President Trump openly proclaimed that he was a nationalist to a cheering crowd at a rally in Texas in support of re-electing Senator Ted Cruz who was once an adversary. On 29 October 2018 Trump equated nationalism to patriotism, saying "I'm proud of this country and I call that ''nationalism.''

In 2016, Rodrigo Duterte became president of the Philippines running a distinctly nationalist campaign. Contrary to the policies of his recent predecessors, he distanced the country from the Philippines' former ruler, the United States, and sought closer ties with China (as well as Russia).

In 2017, Turkish nationalism propelled President Recep Tayyip Erdoğan to gain unprecedented power in a national referendum. Reactions from world leaders were mixed, with Western European leaders generally expressing concern while the leaders of many of the more authoritarian regimes as well as President Trump offered their congratulations.

Political science 
Many political scientists have theorized about the foundations of the modern nation-state and the concept of sovereignty. The concept of nationalism in political science draws from these theoretical foundations. Philosophers like Machiavelli, Locke, Hobbes, and Rousseau conceptualized the state as the result of a "social contract" between rulers and individuals. Max Weber provides the most commonly used definition of the state, "that human community which successfully lays claim to the monopoly of legitimate physical violence within a certain territory". According to Benedict Anderson, nations are "Imagined Communities", or socially constructed institutions.

Many scholars have noted the relationship between state-building, war, and nationalism. Many scholars believe that the development of nationalism in Europe and subsequently the modern nation-state was due to the threat of war. "External threats have such a powerful effect on nationalism because people realize in a profound manner that they are under threat because of who they are as a nation; they are forced to recognize that it is only as a nation that they can successfully defeat the threat". With increased external threats, the state's extractive capacities increase. Jeffrey Herbst argues that the lack of external threats to countries in Sub-Saharan Africa, post-independence, is linked to weak state nationalism and state capacity. Barry Posen argues that nationalism increases the intensity of war, and that states deliberately promote nationalism with the aim of improving their military capabilities. Most new nation-states since 1815 have emerged through decolonization.

Adria Lawrence has argued that nationalism in the colonial world was spurred by failures of colonial powers to extend equal political rights to the subjects in the colonies, thus prompting them to pursue independence. Michael Hechter has argued similarly that "peripheral nationalisms" formed when empires prevented peripheral regions from having autonomy and local rule.

Sociology 
The sociological or modernist interpretation of nationalism and nation-building argues that nationalism arises and flourishes in modern societies that have an industrial economy capable of self-sustainability, a central supreme authority capable of maintaining authority and unity, and a centralized language understood by a community of people. Modernist theorists note that this is only possible in modern societies, while traditional societies typically lack the prerequisites for nationalism. They lack a modern self-sustainable economy, have divided authorities, and use multiple languages resulting in many groups being unable to communicate with each other.

Prominent theorists who developed the modernist interpretation of nations and nationalism include: Carlton J. H. Hayes, Henry Maine, Ferdinand Tönnies, Rabindranath Tagore, Émile Durkheim, Max Weber, Arnold Joseph Toynbee and Talcott Parsons.

In his analysis of the historical changes and development of human societies, Henry Maine noted that the key distinction between traditional societies defined as "status" societies based on family association and functionally diffuse roles for individuals and modern societies defined as "contract" societies where social relations are determined by rational contracts pursued by individuals to advance their interests. Maine saw the development of societies as moving away from traditional status societies to modern contract societies.

In his book Gemeinschaft und Gesellschaft (1887), Ferdinand Tönnies defined a Gemeinschaft ("community") as being based on emotional attachments as attributed with traditional societies while defining a Gesellschaft ("society") as an impersonal society that is modern. Although he recognized the advantages of modern societies, he also criticized them for their cold and impersonal nature that caused alienation while praising the intimacy of traditional communities.

Émile Durkheim expanded upon Tönnies' recognition of alienation and defined the differences between traditional and modern societies as being between societies based upon "mechanical solidarity" versus societies based on "organic solidarity". Durkheim identified mechanical solidarity as involving custom, habit, and repression that was necessary to maintain shared views. Durkheim identified organic solidarity-based societies as modern societies where there exists a division of labour based on social differentiation that causes alienation. Durkheim claimed that social integration in traditional society required authoritarian culture involving acceptance of a social order. Durkheim claimed that modern society bases integration on the mutual benefits of the division of labour, but noted that the impersonal character of modern urban life caused alienation and feelings of anomie.

Max Weber claimed the change that developed modern society and nations is the result of the rise of a charismatic leader to power in a society who creates a new tradition or a rational-legal system that establishes the supreme authority of the state. Weber's conception of charismatic authority has been noted as the basis of many nationalist governments.

Primordialist evolutionary interpretation 
The primordialist perspective is based upon evolutionary theory. This approach has been popular with the general public but is typically rejected by experts. Laland and Brown report that "the vast majority of professional academics in the social sciences not only ... ignore evolutionary methods but in many cases [are] extremely hostile to the arguments" that draw vast generalizations from rather limited evidence.

The evolutionary theory of nationalism perceives nationalism to be the result of the evolution of human beings into identifying with groups, such as ethnic groups, or other groups that form the foundation of a nation. Roger Masters in The Nature of Politics describes the primordial explanation of the origin of ethnic and national groups as recognizing group attachments that are thought to be unique, emotional, intense, and durable because they are based upon kinship and promoted along lines of common ancestry.

The primordia list evolutionary views of nationalism often reference the evolutionary theories of Charles Darwin as well as Social Darwinist views of the late nineteenth century. Thinkers like Herbert Spencer and Walter Bagehot reinterpreted Darwin's theory of natural selection "often in ways inconsistent with Charles Darwin's theory of evolution" by making unsupported claims of biological difference among groups, ethnicities, races, and nations. Modern evolutionary sciences have distanced themselves from such views, but notions of long-term evolutionary change remain foundational to the work of evolutionary psychologists like John Tooby and Leda Cosmides.

Approached through the primordia list perspective, the example of seeing the mobilization of a foreign military force on the nation's borders may provoke members of a national group to unify and mobilize themselves in response. There are proximate environments where individuals identify nonimmediate real or imagined situations in combination with immediate situations that make individuals confront a common situation of both subjective and objective components that affect their decisions. As such proximate environments cause people to make decisions based on existing situations and anticipated situations.

Critics argue that primordial models relying on evolutionary psychology are based not on historical evidence but on assumptions of unobserved changes over thousands of years and assume stable genetic composition of the population living in a specific area and are incapable of handling the contingencies that characterize every known historical process. Robert Hislope argues:
[T]he articulation of cultural evolutionary theory represents theoretical progress over sociobiology, but its explanatory payoff remains limited due to the role of contingency in human affairs and the significance of non-evolutionary, proximate causal factors. While evolutionary theory undoubtedly elucidates the development of all organic life, it would seem to operate best at macro-levels of analysis, "distal" points of explanation, and from the perspective of the long-term. Hence, it is bound to display shortcomings at micro-level events that are highly contingent in nature.

In 1920, English historian G. P. Gooch argued that "[while patriotism is as old as human association and has gradually widened its sphere from the clan and the tribe to the city and the state, nationalism as an operative principle and an articulate creed only made its appearance among the more complicated intellectual processes of the modern world."

Marxist interpretations 
In The Communist Manifesto, Karl Marx and Friedrich Engels declared that "the working men have no country". Vladimir Lenin supported the concept of self-determination. Joseph Stalin's Marxism and the National Question (1913) declares that "a nation is not a racial or tribal, but a historically constituted community of people;" "a nation is not a casual or ephemeral conglomeration, but a stable community of people"; "a nation is formed only as a result of lengthy and systematic intercourse, as a result of people living together generation after generation"; and, in its entirety: "a nation is a historically constituted, stable community of people, formed on the basis of a common language, territory, economic life, and psychological make-up manifested in a common culture."

Types 

Historians, sociologists and anthropologists have debated different types of nationalism since at least the 1930s. Generally, the most common way of classifying nationalism has been to describe movements as having either "civic" or "ethnic" nationalist characteristics. This distinction was popularized in the 1950s by Hans Kohn who described "civic" nationalism as "Western" and more democratic while depicting "ethnic" nationalism as "Eastern" and undemocratic. Since the 1980s, scholars of nationalism have pointed out numerous flaws in this rigid division and proposed more specific classifications and numerous varieties.

Anti-colonial 

Anti-colonial nationalism is an intellectual framework that preceded, accompanied and followed the process of decolonization in the mid-1900s. Benedict Anderson defined a nation as a socially constructed community that is co-created by individuals who imagine themselves as part of this group. He points to the New World as the site that originally conceived of nationalism as a concept, which is defined by its imagination of an ahistorical identity that negates colonialism by definition. This concept of nationalism was exemplified by the transformation of settler colonies into nations, while anti-colonial nationalism is exemplified by movements against colonial powers in the 1900s.

Nationalist mobilization in French colonial Africa and British colonial India developed "when colonial regimes refused to cede rights to their increasingly well-educated colonial subjects",  who formed indigenous elites and strategically adopted and adapted nationalist tactics. New national identities may cross pre-existing ethnic or linguistic divisions. Anti-colonial independence movements in Africa and Asia in the 1900s were led by individuals who had a set of shared identities and imagined a homeland without external rule. Anderson argues that the racism often experienced as a result of colonial rule and attributed to nationalism is rather due to theories of class.

Gellner's theory of nationalism argues that nationalism works for combining one culture or ethnicity in one state, which leads to that state's success. For Gellner, nationalism is ethnic, and state political parties should reflect the ethnic majority in the state. This definition of nationalism also contributes to anti-colonial nationalism, if one conceives of anti-colonial movements to be movements consisting of one specific ethnic group against an outside ruling party. Edward Said also saw nationalism as ethnic, at least in part, and argued that nationalist narratives often go hand in hand with racism, as communities define themselves in relation to the other.

Anti-colonial nationalism is not static and is defined by different forms of nationalism depending on location. In the anti-colonial movement that took place in the Indian subcontinent, Mahatma Gandhi and his allies in the Indian independence movement argued for a composite nationalism, not believing that an independent Indian nation should be defined by its religious identity. Despite large-scale opposition, the Indian subcontinent was partitioned into two states in 1947: the Muslim-majority Pakistan and the Hindu-majority Dominion of India.

Because of colonialism's creation of state and country lines across ethnic, religious, linguistic and other historical boundaries, anti-colonial nationalism is largely related to land first. After independence, especially in countries with particularly diverse populations with historic enmity, there have been a series of smaller independence movements that are also defined by anti-colonialism.

Philosopher and scholar Achille Mbembe argues that post-colonialism is a contradictory term, because colonialism is ever present. Those that participate in this intellectual practice envision a post-colonialism despite its being the defining frame for the world. This is the case with anti-colonialism as well. Anti-colonial nationalism as an intellectual framework persisted into the late 20th century with the resistance movements in Soviet satellite states and continues with independence movements in the Arab world in the 21st century.

Civic and liberal 

Civic nationalism defines the nation as an association of people who identify themselves as belonging to the nation, who have equal and shared political rights, and allegiance to similar political procedures. According to the principles of civic nationalism, the nation is not based on common ethnic ancestry, but is a political entity whose core identity is not ethnicity. This civic concept of nationalism is exemplified by Ernest Renan in his lecture in 1882 "What is a Nation?", where he defined the nation as a "daily referendum" (frequently translated "daily plebiscite") dependent on the will of its people to continue living together.

Civic nationalism is normally associated with liberal nationalism, although the two are distinct, and did not always coincide. On the one hand, until the late 19th and early 20th century adherents to anti-Enlightenment movements such as French Legitimism or Spanish Carlism often rejected the liberal, national unitary state, yet identified themselves not with an ethnic nation but with a non-national dynasty and regional feudal privileges. Xenophobic movements in long-established Western European states indeed often took a 'civic national' form, rejecting a given group's ability to assimilate with the nation due to its belonging to a cross-border community (Irish Catholics in Britain, Ashkenazic Jews in France). On the other hand, while subnational separatist movements were commonly associated with ethnic nationalism, this was not always so, and such nationalists as the Corsican Republic, United Irishmen, Breton Federalist League or Catalan Republican Party could combine a rejection of the unitary civic-national state with a belief in liberal universalism.

Liberal nationalism is kind of non-xenophobic nationalism that is claimed to be compatible with liberal values of freedom, tolerance, equality, and individual rights. Ernest Renan and John Stuart Mill are often thought to be early liberal nationalists. Liberal nationalists often defend the value of national identity by saying that individuals need a national identity to lead meaningful, autonomous lives, and that liberal democratic polities need national identity to function properly.

Civic nationalism lies within the traditions of rationalism and liberalism, but as a form of nationalism it is usually contrasted with ethnic nationalism. Civic nationalism is correlated with long-established states whose dynastic rulers had gradually acquired multiple distinct territories, with little change to boundaries, but which contained historical populations of multiple linguistic and/or confessional backgrounds. Since individual's resident within different parts of the state territory might have little obvious common ground, civic nationalism developed as a way for rulers to both explain a contemporary reason for such heterogeneity and to provide a common purpose (Ernest Renan's classic description in What is a Nation? (1882) as a voluntary partnership for a common endeavor). Renan argued that factors such as ethnicity, language, religion, economics, geography, ruling dynasty and historic military deeds were important but not sufficient. Needed was a spiritual soul that allowed as a "daily referendum" among the people. Civic-national ideals influenced the development of representative democracy in multiethnic countries such as the United States and France, as well as in constitutional monarchies such as Great Britain, Belgium and Spain.

German philosopher Monika Kirloskar-Steinbach does not think liberalism and nationalism are compatible, but she points out there are many liberals who think they are. Kirloskar-Steinbach states:
Justifications of nationalism seem to be making a headway in political philosophy. Its proponents contend that liberalism and nationalism are not necessarily mutually exclusive and that they can in fact be made compatible. Liberal nationalists urge one to consider nationalism not as the pathology of modernity but as an answer to its malaise. For them, nationalism is more than an infantile disease, more than "the measles of mankind" as Einstein once proclaimed it to be. They argue that nationalism is a legitimate way of understanding one's role and place in life. They strive for a normative justification of nationalism which lies within liberal limits. The main claim which seems to be involved here is that as long as a nationalism abhors violence and propagates liberal rights and equal citizenship for all citizens of its state, its philosophical credentials can be considered to be sound.

Creole 

Creole nationalism is the ideology that emerged in independence movements among the creoles (descendants of the colonizers), especially in Latin America in the early 19th century. It was facilitated when French Emperor Napoleon seized control of Spain and Portugal, breaking the chain of control from the Spanish and Portuguese kings to the local governors. Allegiance to the Napoleonic states was rejected, and increasingly the creoles demanded independence. They achieved it after civil wars 1808–1826.

Ethnic  

Ethnic nationalism, also known as ethno-nationalism, is a form of nationalism wherein the "nation" is defined in terms of ethnicity. The central theme of ethnic nationalists is that "nations are defined by a shared heritage, which usually includes a common language, a common faith, and a common ethnic ancestry". It also includes ideas of a culture shared between members of the group, and with their ancestors. It is different from a purely cultural definition of "the nation," which allows people to become members of a nation by cultural assimilation; and from a purely linguistic definition, according to which "the nation" consists of all speakers of a specific language.

Whereas nationalism in and of itself does not imply a belief in the superiority of one ethnicity or country over others, some nationalists support ethnocentric supremacy or protectionism.

The humiliation of being a second-class citizen led regional minorities in multiethnic states, such as Great Britain, Spain, France, Germany, Russia and the Ottoman Empire, to define nationalism in terms of loyalty to their minority culture, especially language and religion. Forced assimilation was anathema.

For the politically dominant cultural group, assimilation was necessary to minimize disloyalty and treason and therefore became a major component of nationalism. A second factor for the politically dominant group was competition with neighboring states—nationalism involved a rivalry, especially in terms of military prowess and economic strength.

Economic 

Economic nationalism, or economic patriotism, is an ideology that favors state interventionism in the economy, with policies that emphasize domestic control of the economy, labor, and capital formation, even if this requires the imposition of tariffs and other restrictions on the movement of labor, goods and capital.

Gendered and muscular 

Feminist critique interprets nationalism as a mechanism through which sexual control and repression are justified and legitimized, often by a dominant masculine power. The gendering of nationalism through socially constructed notions of masculinity and femininity not only shapes what masculine and feminine participation in the building of that nation will look like, but also how the nation will be imagined by nationalists. A nation having its own identity is viewed as necessary, and often inevitable, and these identities are gendered. The physical land itself is often gendered as female (i.e. "Motherland"), with a body in constant danger of violation by foreign males, while national pride and protectiveness of "her" borders is gendered as masculine.

History, political ideologies, and religions place most nations along a continuum of muscular nationalism. Muscular nationalism conceptualizes a nation's identity as being derived from muscular or masculine attributes that are unique to a particular country. If definitions of nationalism and gender are understood as socially and culturally constructed, the two may be constructed in conjunction by invoking an "us" versus "them" dichotomy for the purpose of the exclusion of the so-called "other," who is used to reinforce the unifying ties of the nation. The empowerment of one gender, nation or sexuality tends to occur at the expense and disempowerment of another; in this way, nationalism can be used as an instrument to perpetuate heteronormative structures of power. The gendered manner in which dominant nationalism has been imagined in most states in the world has had important implications on not only individual's lived experience, but on international relations. Colonialism has historically been heavily intertwined with muscular nationalism, from research linking hegemonic masculinity and empire-building, to intersectional oppression being justified by colonialist images of the “other”, a practice integral in the formation of Western identity. This “othering” may come in the form of orientalism, whereby the East is feminized and sexualized by the West. The imagined feminine East, or “other,” exists in contrast to the masculine West.

The status of conquered nations can become a causality dilemma: the nation was “conquered because they were effeminate and seen as effeminate because they were conquered.” In defeat they are considered militaristically unskilled, not aggressive, and thus not muscular. In order for a nation to be considered “proper”, it must possess the male-gendered characteristics of virility, as opposed to the stereotypically female characteristics of subservience and dependency. Muscular nationalism is often inseparable from the concept of a warrior, which shares ideological commonalities across many nations; they are defined by the masculine notions of aggression, willingness to engage in war, decisiveness, and muscular strength, as opposed to the feminine notions of peacefulness, weakness, non-violence, and compassion. This masculinized image of a warrior has been theorized to be “the culmination of a series of gendered historical and social processes" played out in a national and international context. Ideas of cultural dualism—of a martial man and chaste woman—which are implicit in muscular nationalism, underline the raced, classed, gendered, and heteronormative nature of dominant national identity.

Nations and gender systems are mutually supportive constructions: the nation fulfils the masculine ideals of comradeship and brotherhood. Masculinity has been cited as a notable factor in producing political militancy. A common feature of national crisis is a drastic shift in the socially acceptable ways of being a man, which then helps to shape the gendered perception of the nation as a whole.

Integral, pan and irredentism 

There are different types of nationalism including Risorgimento nationalism and Integral nationalism. Whereas risorgimento nationalism applies to a nation seeking to establish a liberal state (for example the Risorgimento in Italy and similar movements in Greece, Germany, Poland during the 19th century or the civic American nationalism), integral nationalism results after a nation has achieved independence and has established a state. Fascist Italy and Nazi Germany, according to Alter and Brown, were examples of integral nationalism.

Some of the qualities that characterize integral nationalism are anti-individualism, statism, radical extremism, and aggressive-expansionist militarism. The term Integral Nationalism often overlaps with fascism, although many natural points of disagreement exist. Integral nationalism arises in countries where a strong military ethos has become entrenched through the independence struggle, when, once independence is achieved, it is believed that a strong military is required to ensure the security and viability of the new state. Also, the success of such a liberation struggle results in feelings of national superiority that may lead to extreme nationalism.

Pan-nationalism is unique in that it covers a large area span. Pan-nationalism focuses more on "clusters" of ethnic groups. Pan-Slavism is one example of Pan-nationalism. The goal is to unite all Slavic people into one country. They did succeed by uniting several south Slavic people into Yugoslavia in 1918.

Left-wing 

Left-wing nationalism, occasionally known as socialist nationalism, not to be confused with the German fascist National Socialism, is a political movement that combines left-wing politics with nationalism.

Many nationalist movements are dedicated to national liberation, in the view that their nations are being persecuted by other nations and thus need to exercise self-determination by liberating themselves from the accused persecutors. Anti-revisionist Marxism–Leninism is closely tied with this ideology, and practical examples include Stalin's early work Marxism and the National Question and his socialism in one country edict, which declares that nationalism can be used in an internationalist context, fighting for national liberation without racial or religious divisions.

Other examples of left-wing nationalism include Fidel Castro's 26th of July Movement that launched the Cuban Revolution in 1959, Cornwall's Mebyon Kernow, Ireland's Sinn Féin, Wales's Plaid Cymru, Galicia's Galician Nationalist Bloc, the Awami League in Bangladesh, the African National Congress in South Africa and numerous movements in Eastern Europe.

National-anarchism 

Among the first advocates of national-anarchism were Hans Cany, Peter Töpfer and former National Front activist Troy Southgate, founder of the National Revolutionary Faction, a since disbanded British-based organization which cultivated links to certain far-left and far-right circles in the United Kingdom and in post-Soviet states, not to be confused with the national-anarchism of the Black Ram Group. In the United Kingdom, national-anarchists worked with Albion Awake, Alternative Green (published by former Green Anarchist editor Richard Hunt) and Jonathan Boulter to develop the Anarchist Heretics Fair. Those national-anarchists cite their influences primarily from Mikhail Bakunin, William Godwin, Peter Kropotkin, Pierre-Joseph Proudhon, Max Stirner and Leo Tolstoy.

A position developed in Europe during the 1990s, national-anarchist groups have seen arisen worldwide, most prominently in Australia (New Right Australia/New Zealand), Germany (International National Anarchism) and the United States (BANA). National-anarchism has been described as a radical right-wing nationalist ideology which advocates racial separatism and white racial purity. National-anarchists claim to syncretize neotribal ethnic nationalism with philosophical anarchism, mainly in their support for a stateless society whilst rejecting anarchist social philosophy. The main ideological innovation of national-anarchism is its anti-state palingenetic ultranationalism. National-anarchists advocate homogeneous communities in place of the nation state. National-anarchists claim that those of different ethnic or racial groups would be free to develop separately in their own tribal communes while striving to be politically meritocratic, economically non-capitalist, ecologically sustainable and socially and culturally traditional.

Although the term national-anarchism dates back as far as the 1920s, the contemporary national-anarchist movement has been put forward since the late 1990s by British political activist Troy Southgate, who positions it as being "beyond left and right". The few scholars who have studied national-anarchism conclude that it represents a further evolution in the thinking of the radical right rather than an entirely new dimension on the political spectrum. National-anarchism is considered by anarchists as being a rebranding of totalitarian fascism and an oxymoron due to the inherent contradiction of anarchist philosophy of anti-fascism, abolition of unjustified hierarchy, dismantling of national borders and universal equality between different nationalities as being incompatible with the idea of a synthesis between anarchism and fascism.

National-anarchism has elicited scepticism and outright hostility from both left-wing and far-right critics. Critics, including scholars, accuse national-anarchists of being nothing more than white nationalists who promote a communitarian and racialist form of ethnic and racial separatism while wanting the militant chic of calling themselves anarchists without the historical and philosophical baggage that accompanies such a claim, including the anti-racist egalitarian anarchist philosophy and the contributions of Jewish anarchists. Some scholars are sceptical that implementing national-anarchism would result in an expansion of freedom and describe it as an authoritarian anti-statism that would result in authoritarianism and oppression, only on a smaller scale.

Nativist 

Nativist nationalism is a type of nationalism similar to creole or territorial types of nationalism, but which defines belonging to a nation solely by being born on its territory. In countries where strong nativist nationalism exists, people who were not born in the country are seen as lesser nationals than those who were born there and are called immigrants even if they became naturalized. It is cultural as people will never see a foreign-born person as one of them and is legal as such people are banned for life from holding certain jobs, especially government jobs. In scholarly studies, nativism is a standard technical term, although those who hold this political view do not typically accept the label.  . . . do not consider themselves nativists. For them it is a negative term and they rather consider themselves as 'Patriots'."

Racial 

Racial nationalism is an ideology that advocates a racial definition of national identity. Racial nationalism seeks to preserve a given race through policies such as banning race mixing and the immigration of other races. Specific examples are black nationalism and white nationalism.

Religious 

Religious nationalism is the relationship of nationalism to a particular religious belief, dogma, or affiliation where a shared religion can be seen to contribute to a sense of national unity, a common bond among the citizens of the nation. Saudi Arabian, Iranian, Egyptian, Iraqi, American, Indian and the Pakistani-Islamic nationalism (Two-Nation Theory) are some examples.

Territorial 

Some nationalists exclude certain groups. Some nationalists, defining the national community in ethnic, linguistic, cultural, historic, or religious terms (or a combination of these), may then seek to deem certain minorities as not truly being a part of the 'national community' as they define it. Sometimes a mythic homeland is more important for the national identity than the actual territory occupied by the nation.

Territorial nationalists assume that all inhabitants of a particular nation owe allegiance to their country of birth or adoption. A sacred quality is sought in the nation and in the popular memories it evokes. Citizenship is idealized by territorial nationalists. A criterion of a territorial nationalism is the establishment of a mass, public culture based on common values, codes and traditions of the population.

Sport 

Sport spectacles like football's World Cup command worldwide audiences as nations battle for supremacy and the fans invest intense support for their national team. Increasingly people have tied their loyalties and even their cultural identity to national teams. The globalization of audiences through television and other media has generated revenues from advertisers and subscribers in the billions of dollars, as the FIFA Scandals of 2015 revealed. Jeff Kingston looks at football, the Commonwealth Games, baseball, cricket, and the Olympics and finds that, "The capacity of sports to ignite and amplify nationalist passions and prejudices is as extraordinary as is their power to console, unify, uplift and generate goodwill." The phenomenon is evident across most of the world. The British Empire strongly emphasized sports among its soldiers and agents across the world, and often the locals joined in enthusiastically. It established a high prestige competition in 1930, named the British Empire Games from 1930 to 1950, the British Empire and Commonwealth Games from 1954 to 1966, British Commonwealth Games from 1970 to 1974 and since then the Commonwealth Games.

The French Empire was not far behind the British in the use of sports to strengthen colonial solidarity with France. Colonial officials promoted and subsidized gymnastics, table games, and dance and helped football spread to French colonies.

Pandemic 

Harris Mylonas and Ned Whalley co-edited a special issue on "pandemic nationalism" exploring the relationship between nationalism and the COVID-19 pandemic. While nationalism unquestionably helped overcome collective action problems within state borders during the pandemic, it has undermined them at the global scale. The most clear example being been the abject failure of international organizations to coordinate an appropriate response. As they put it, "During the pandemic, a nationalist human calculus has prevailed. Solidarity has been extended to co-nationals but has been less forthcoming beyond that point. All states have responded by turning inward. Border closures have been at the heart of mitigation efforts from the very beginning, and lockdowns legitimated and often enforced through national and patriotic discourses."

Criticism 

Critics of nationalism have argued that it is often unclear what constitutes a nation, or whether a nation is a legitimate unit of political rule. Nationalists hold that the boundaries of a nation and a state should coincide with one another, thus nationalism tends to oppose multiculturalism. It can also lead to conflict when more than one national group finds itself claiming rights to a particular territory or seeking to take control of the state.

Philosopher A. C. Grayling describes nations as artificial constructs, "their boundaries drawn in the blood of past wars". He argues that "there is no country on earth which is not home to more than one different but usually coexisting culture. Cultural heritage is not the same thing as national identity".

Nationalism is considered by its critics to be inherently divisive, as adherents may draw upon and highlight perceived differences between people, emphasizing an individual's identification with their own nation. They also consider the idea to be potentially oppressive, because it can submerge individual identity within a national whole and give elites or political leaders potential opportunities to manipulate or control the masses. Much of the early opposition to nationalism was related to its geopolitical ideal of a separate state for every nation. The classic nationalist movements of the 19th century rejected the very existence of the multi-ethnic empires in Europe, contrary to an ideological critique of nationalism which developed into several forms of internationalism and anti-nationalism. The Islamic revival of the 20th century also produced an Islamist critique of the nation-state. (see Pan-Islamism)

At the end of the 19th century, Marxists and other socialists and communists (such as Rosa Luxemburg) produced political analyses that were critical of the nationalist movements then active in Central and Eastern Europe, although a variety of other contemporary socialists and communists, from Vladimir Lenin (a communist) to Józef Piłsudski (a socialist), were more sympathetic to national self-determination.

In his classic essay on the topic, George Orwell distinguishes nationalism from patriotism which he defines as devotion to a particular place. More abstractly, nationalism is "power-hunger tempered by self-deception". For Orwell, the nationalist is more likely than not dominated by irrational negative impulses:
There are, for example, Trotskyists who have become simply enemies of the U.S.S.R. without developing a corresponding loyalty to any other unit. When one grasps the implications of this, the nature of what I mean by nationalism becomes a good deal clearer. A nationalist is one who thinks solely, or mainly, in terms of competitive prestige. He may be a positive or a negative nationalist—that is, he may use his mental energy either in boosting or in denigrating—but at any rate his thoughts always turn on victories, defeats, triumphs and humiliations. He sees history, especially contemporary history, as the endless rise and decline of great power units and every event that happens seems to him a demonstration that his own side is on the upgrade and some hated rival is on the downgrade. But finally, it is important not to confuse nationalism with mere worship of success. The nationalist does not go on the principle of simply ganging up with the strongest side. On the contrary, having picked his side, he persuades himself that it is the strongest and is able to stick to his belief even when the facts are overwhelmingly against him.

In the liberal political tradition there was mostly a negative attitude toward nationalism as a dangerous force and a cause of conflict and war between nation-states. The historian Lord Acton put the case for "nationalism as insanity" in 1862. He argued that nationalism suppresses minorities, places country above moral principles and creates a dangerous individual attachment to the state. He opposed democracy and tried to defend the pope from Italian nationalism. Since the late 20th century, liberals have been increasingly divided, with some philosophers such as Michael Walzer, Isaiah Berlin, Charles Taylor and David Miller emphasizing that a liberal society needs to be based in a stable nation state.

The pacifist critique of nationalism also concentrates on the violence of some nationalist movements, the associated militarism, and on conflicts between nations inspired by jingoism or chauvinism. National symbols and patriotic assertiveness are in some countries discredited by their historical link with past wars, especially in Germany. British pacifist Bertrand Russell criticized nationalism for diminishing the individual's capacity to judge his or her fatherland's foreign policy. Albert Einstein stated that "Nationalism is an infantile disease. It is the measles of mankind". Jiddu Krishnamurti stated that "Nationalism is merely the glorification of tribalism".

Transhumanists have also expressed their opposition to nationalism, to the extent that some transhumanists believe national identities should be dissolved entirely. The influential transhumanist FM-2030 refused to identify with any nationality, referring to himself as 'universal'. Furthermore, in The Transhumanist Handbook, Kate Levchuk stated that a transhumanist "doesn't believe in nationality".

See also

Notes

References 

 
 
 
 Hayes, Carlton J. The Historical Evolution of Modern Nationalism (1928) the first major scholarly survey.
 
 
 
 
 Kohn, Hans. The Idea of Nationalism: A Study in Its Origins and Background (1944; 2nd ed. 2005 with introduction by Craig Calhoun). 735 pp; an often-cited classic
 
 
 
 
Mylonas, Harris; Tudor, Maya (2021). "Nationalism: What We Know and What We Still Need to Know". Annual Review of Political Science. 24 (1): 109–132.

Further reading 

 Baycroft, Timothy. Nationalism in Europe 1789–1945 (1998), textbook; 104 pp.
 
 Breuilly, John, ed. The Oxford handbook of the history of nationalism (Oxford UP, 2013).
 
 
 Gellner, Ernest. Nations and Nationalism (2nd ed. 2009).
 Gerrits, Nationalism in Europe since 1945 (2015).
 
 Guibernau, Montserrat 2007 (The Identity of Nations) Polity Press, Cambridge UK
 Guibernau, Montserrat 2013 (Belonging: solidarity and division in modern societies) Polity Press, Cambridge
 
 Kingston, Jeff.  Nationalism in Asia: A History Since 1945 (2016).
 Kohn, Hans. Nationalism: Its Meaning and History (1955) 192 pp, with primary sources online
 Kramer, Lloyd. Nationalism in Europe and America: Politics, Cultures, and Identities since 1775 (2011). excerpt

External links 

 "Encyclopedia of 1848 Revolutions", comprehensive collection of new articles by modern scholars
 Nationalism – entry at Encyclopædia Britannica
 
 
 Nationalism : selected references

 
Political theories